Lachen verlernt (Laughing Unlearnt) is a chaconne for solo violin by the Finnish composer Esa-Pekka Salonen.  The work was commissioned by the La Jolla Chamber Music Society's SummerFest with additional contributions from Joan and Irwin M. Jacobs.  It was written for violinist Cho-Liang Lin, to whom the piece is dedicated.  It was first performed by Cho-Liang Lin at the La Jolla SummerFest, La Jolla, August 10, 2002.

Composition
Lachen verlernt is composed in a single movement has a duration of roughly 10 minutes.  The title of the piece is a quote from the ninth movement of Arnold Schoenberg's Pierrot Lunaire.  Salonen described the title and form of the work in the score program notes, writing:

Reception
Reviewing the world premiere, Mark Swed of the Los Angeles Times called it "an unusually unsettled and dark-seeming tone from a composer whose works have tended to be sunnier. Alone, it says something about our times."  Swed continued:
Molly Sheridan of NewMusicBox later described the piece as "a little showy, a little classic, a little melancholy, but mostly just written in such a way that it fits together as tightly as an aural jigsaw puzzle."

References

Compositions by Esa-Pekka Salonen
2002 compositions
Solo violin pieces